IROC VI was the sixth year of IROC competition, which took place in 1978 and 1979. The format changed from IROC V in that three qualifying races were held for participants from NASCAR, USAC Champ Car, and Road Racing (which primarily consisted of Formula One, SCCA, and IMSA). The top four finishers in these qualifying races then earned the chance to race in the two final races at Riverside International Raceway and Atlanta Motor Speedway.  It used the Chevrolet Camaro in all races. Mario Andretti won the road racing finale en route to the championship and $75,000.

The final points standings were as follows:

Race results

Qualifying Races

NASCAR Qualifying Race, Michigan International Speedway

 Bobby Allison
 Cale Yarborough
 Donnie Allison
 Neil Bonnett
 David Pearson
 Benny Parsons
 Dave Marcis
 Darrell Waltrip

USAC Champ Car Qualifying Race, Michigan International Speedway

 A. J. Foyt
 Al Unser
 Gordon Johncock
 Tom Sneva
 Danny Ongais
 Johnny Rutherford
 Rick Mears
 Bobby Unser

Road Racing Qualifying Race, Riverside International Raceway 

 Peter Gregg
 Emerson Fittipaldi
 Mario Andretti
 Alan Jones
 David Hobbs
 Patrick Depailler
 John Watson
 Niki Lauda

Final Races

Road Racing Final, Riverside International Raceway 

 Mario Andretti
 Cale Yarborough
 Bobby Allison
 Alan Jones
 Emerson Fittipaldi
 Gordon Johncock
 Neil Bonnett
 Tom Sneva
 Peter Gregg
 Donnie Allison
 Al Unser
 A. J. Foyt

Oval Final, Atlanta Motor Speedway 

 Neil Bonnett
 Mario Andretti
 Bobby Allison
 Cale Yarborough
 Tom Sneva
 Gordon Johncock
 Peter Gregg
 Alan Jones
 Emerson Fittipaldi
 Al Unser
 Donnie Allison

References

External links
IROC VI History - IROC Website

International Race of Champions
1978 in American motorsport
1979 in American motorsport